LIB may refer to:

Science and technology
 Label Information Base, a software table in networking routers
 Library (computing), a collection of permanent programming resources
 Lithium-ion battery, a type of, usually secondary, electrical battery

Other uses
 Lebanon, former IOC country code (1964-2016; now LBN)
 Lëvizja për Integrim dhe Bashkim (Movement for Integration and Unification), a political party in Kosovo
 Libya, UNDP country code
 Lightning in a Bottle, a music festival in Southern California
 Long Island Bus, now called Nassau Inter-County Express
 International School of Boston (Lycée International de Boston)

See also
 Lib (disambiguation)
 Let It Be (disambiguation), various musical and cinematic works
 Let It Bleed (disambiguation), various works

cs:LIB
ja:リブ